M. gigantea may refer to:
 Macaranga gigantea, the elephant ear tree
 Manis gigantea, the giant pangolin, a mammal species found in Africa
 Megateuthis gigantea, the largest known belemnite species found in Europe and Asia
 Melampitta gigantea, the greater melampitta, a bird species
 Myristica gigantea, a plant species found in Indonesia and Malaysia

See also
 Gigantea (disambiguation)